Grapham Diprose is a British photographer and author.

During the 1970s and 1980s, Diprose worked as a freelance advertising photographer in central London, while teaching studio photography part-time. In the 1980s and 1990s, he was a full-time lecturer at the London College of Communication, becoming Lead Tutor in Photography within the Faculty of Design. Later, he was Lead Tutor at the Speos Institute in London. He has an interest in both traditional photography and digital photography.

Diprose has been involved with research concerning the history of the River Thames, including following the photography of the early photographer Henry Taunt (1842–1922). He has also produced a photography textbook for Thames & Hudson, published in the United Kingdom, United States, and translated into Mandarin Chinese. In 2018, he aided the long-term preservation of photographs by Michael George for the University College, Oxford archive, with the college's archivist Robin Darwall-Smith.

Diprose has been on the Organising Committee for the EVA London Conference on Electronic Visualisation and the Arts since 2015, latterly as the main conference chair. He also liaises with the Art in Flux group of London-based digital artists.

Selected books
Graham Diprose's books include:

References

External links
 Graham Diprose on LinkedIn
 Graham Diprose on ResearchGate
 

Year of birth missing (living people)
Living people
20th-century photographers
21st-century photographers
21st-century British non-fiction writers
English photographers
English non-fiction writers
Writers on photographic techniques
Commercial photographers
Landscape photographers
Academics of the London College of Communication